Urgleptes is a genus of longhorn beetles of the subfamily Lamiinae. It was described by Dillon in 1956.

Species

 Urgleptes abstersus (Bates, 1885)
 Urgleptes amoenulus (Bates, 1863)
 Urgleptes amplicollis (Bates, 1885)
 Urgleptes bicoloratus Gilmour, 1960
 Urgleptes bimaculatus Gilmour, 1960
 Urgleptes bivittatus Gilmour, 1961
 Urgleptes borikensis Micheli & Micheli, 2004
 Urgleptes bruchi (Melzer, 1932)
 Urgleptes callizonus (Bates, 1885)
 Urgleptes cazieri Gilmour, 1961
 Urgleptes celtis (Schaeffer, 1905)
 Urgleptes chamaeropsis (Fisher, 1926)
 Urgleptes charillus (Bates, 1885)
 Urgleptes clarkei Chemsak, 1966
 Urgleptes clerulus (Bates, 1881)
 Urgleptes cobbeni Gilmour, 1963
 Urgleptes debilis (Melzer, 1932)
 Urgleptes decens (Melzer, 1932)
 Urgleptes delicatus (Bates, 1863)
 Urgleptes deliciolus (Bates, 1863)
 Urgleptes dorcadioides (White, 1855)
 Urgleptes dorotheae Gilmour, 1960
 Urgleptes duffyi Gilmour, 1961
 Urgleptes euprepes (Bates, 1885)
 Urgleptes facetus (Say, 1826)
 Urgleptes fasciatus (Bates, 1881)
 Urgleptes foveatocollis (Hamilton in Leng & Hamilton, 1896)
 Urgleptes franciscanus (Melzer, 1935)
 Urgleptes freudei Gilmour, 1959
 Urgleptes gahani Chalumeau, 1983
 Urgleptes guadeloupensis (Fleutiaux & Sallé, 1889)
 Urgleptes haitiensis Gilmour, 1963
 Urgleptes histrionella (Bates, 1885)
 Urgleptes humilis (Bates, 1863)
 Urgleptes hummelincki Gilmour, 1968
 Urgleptes inops (Bates, 1863)
 Urgleptes kuscheli Linsley & Chemsak, 1966
 Urgleptes laticollis (Bates, 1881)
 Urgleptes laxicollis Gilmour, 1960
 Urgleptes leopaulini Touroult, 2004
 Urgleptes literatus (Bates, 1885)
 Urgleptes litoralis Gilmour, 1962
 Urgleptes maculatus Gilmour, 1962
 Urgleptes mancus (Melzer, 1932)
 Urgleptes melzeri Gilmour, 1959
 Urgleptes minutissimus (Bates, 1863)
 Urgleptes miser (Bates, 1863)
 Urgleptes mixtus (Bates, 1881)
 Urgleptes multinotatus (Bates, 1881)
 Urgleptes mundulus (Bates, 1885)
 Urgleptes musculus (Bates, 1863)
 Urgleptes nanus (Melzer, 1934)
 Urgleptes nigridorsis (Bates, 1885)
 Urgleptes obscurellus (Bates, 1863)
 Urgleptes ornatissimus (Bates, 1885)
 Urgleptes ovalis (Bates, 1866)
 Urgleptes ozophagus Chemsak & Feller, 1988
 Urgleptes pallidulus (Bates, 1885)
 Urgleptes pareuprepes Gilmour, 1960
 Urgleptes physoderus (Bates, 1885)
 Urgleptes pluristrigosus (Bates, 1885)
 Urgleptes prolixus (Melzer, 1931)
 Urgleptes puertoricensis Gilmour, 1963
 Urgleptes puerulus (Melzer, 1932)
 Urgleptes pusillus (Melzer, 1932)
 Urgleptes querci (Fitch, 1858)
 Urgleptes recki (Melzer, 1934)
 Urgleptes ruficollis (Bates, 1881)
 Urgleptes sandersoni Gilmour, 1963
 Urgleptes signatus (LeConte, 1852)
 Urgleptes sinuosus Gilmour, 1960
 Urgleptes sordidus (Bates, 1881)
 Urgleptes spinifer (Bates, 1863)
 Urgleptes trilineatus Gilmour, 1962
 Urgleptes trivittatus (Bates, 1885)
 Urgleptes tumidicollis (Bates, 1881)
 Urgleptes unilineatus (Bates, 1872)
 Urgleptes vauriearum Gilmour, 1960
 Urgleptes villiersi Gilmour, 1962
 Urgleptes xantho (Bates, 1885)

References

 
Cerambycidae genera